McCartney Tevin Naweseb (born 30 August 1997) is a Namibian professional footballer who plays as an attacker for the Namibia national team.

Club career 
In February 2020, Naweseb signed for Uzbek club FC Qizilqum Zarafshon before leaving in August 2020.

In January 2021, Sevan announced that Naweseb had left the club.

References

Living people
1997 births
Namibian men's footballers
Association football forwards
Black Africa S.C. players
Namibia Premier League players
Uzbekistan Super League players
Namibia international footballers
Namibian expatriate footballers
Expatriate footballers in Uzbekistan
Expatriate footballers in Armenia
FC Qizilqum Zarafshon players
Sevan FC players
Footballers from Windhoek